The S24 is a regional railway line of the Zürich S-Bahn of the Zürcher Verkehrsverbund (ZVV), Zürich transportation network. The line was significantly extended in June 2014, and again in December 2015, and has  
subsumed the S21 (originally S1) line previously providing service in parts of its extended route.

Route 
 

The line runs from Zug to Thayngen and Weinfelden via Thalwil, Zürich Hauptbahnhof, Zürich Flughafen and Winterthur. The service is accelerated between Neuhausen and Winterthur as well as between Baar and Zug where only the most important stops are served. The following stations are served:

Stations

Stations served by trains on the S24 Weinfelden branch 
 Weinfelden (TG)
 Märstetten
 Müllheim-Wigoltingen
 Hüttlingen-Mettendorf
 Felben-Wellhausen
 Frauenfeld
 Islikon
 Rickenbach-Attikon
 Wiesendangen (ZH)
 Oberwinterthur
 Winterthur

Stations served by trains on the S24 Thayngen branch 
 Thayngen
 Herblingen
 Schaffhausen
 Neuhausen
 Andelfingen
 Winterthur

Stations served by all S24 trains 
 Winterthur
 Kemptthal
 Effretikon
Bassersdorf
 Zürich Flughafen
 Zürich Oerlikon
 Zürich Wipkingen
 Zürich Hauptbahnhof
 Zürich Wiedikon
 Zürich Enge
 Zürich Wollishofen
 Kilchberg
 Rüschlikon
 Thalwil
 Oberrieden Dorf
 Horgen Oberdorf
 Baar
 Zug

The S24 is now the only S-Bahn line left that reverses direction in one of the Hauptbahnhof's surface-level terminal platforms rather than running through one of the station's underground platforms.

Rolling stock 
Most trips are operated using RABe 514 double-decker electric multiple units and Re 450

Scheduling 
Trains normally operate every half-hour between Winterthur and Zug, with alternate trains starting from Thayngen and Weinfelden. The trip between Thayngen and Zug takes 1 hour 53 minutes. It takes 1 hour 47 minutes for the alternate train between Weinfelden and Zug.

History 
Before June 2014, S24 referred to a shorter line, running only between Zürich Hauptbahnhof and Horgen Oberdorf. This overlapped with service S21, which connected Thalwil and Zug. Prior to 2012, the S21 also served Sihlbrugg station, situated between Baar and Horgen and permanently closed in that year.

In 2014, the S24 was extended at its southern end to Zug in replacement of the S21, which was then discontinued. At its northern end, it was extended to Zürich Oerlikon in order to provide service to Zürich Wipkingen station, which lost its previous service by lines S2, S8 and S14 when they were diverted to use the Weinberg Tunnel. In late 2015, the S24 was further extended from Zürich Oerlikon to Zürich Flughafen, Winterthur, Schaffhausen and Thayngen, in order to replace service by the S16 which was curtailed to Zürich Airport.

In December 2021, the stop in Kemptthal will be swapped from the S7 to the S24, to improve stability and punctuality in the very busy Winterthur-Effretikon part. In the evenings from 9:20 p.m., when the S24 only runs on the Zug–Effretikon section, the S7 will keep stopping in Kemptthal.

See also 

 Rail transport in Switzerland
 Trams in Zürich

References

External links 

 

Zürich S-Bahn lines
Canton of Zug
Transport in the canton of Zürich